Legislative Council elections were held in Southern Rhodesia on 30 April 1920, the seventh elections to the Legislative Council.

Electoral system
The Legislative Council comprised thirteen elected members, together with six members nominated by the British South Africa Company, and the Administrator of Southern Rhodesia. The Resident Commissioner of Southern Rhodesia, Crawford Douglas Douglas-Jones, also sat on the Legislative Council ex officio but without the right to vote.

An important change in the franchise had been made in 1919 through the Women's Enfranchisement Ordinance, which gave the vote to women on the same basis as men. Married women (except those married under a system of polygamy) qualified under the financial and educational status of their husbands, if they did not possess them in their own right. This brought 3,467 new voters to the lists.

New districts were needed for this election under a provision of the 1914 proclamation that had created the 12 separate districts. The proclamation allowed for an automatic increase of one new district for each increase of 792 voters. The required number had been reached in 1917. The boundary changes that followed left the Eastern district untouched, as well as the four districts in the south-west (Bulawayo District, Bulawayo North, Bulawayo South, and Western).

Parties
Previous elections to the Legislative Council were contested by individuals standing on their own records. By 1914, although no political parties had been created, the candidates for the Legislative Council had been broadly grouped in two camps, one favouring renewal of the Charter from the British South Africa Company, and the other moves towards full self-government within the Empire.

By 1920 political parties had been formed, largely around these ideas. The Responsible Government Association, headed by Sir Charles Coghlan, sought a form of administrative autonomy within the Empire. They were in alliance with the Rhodesia Labour Party throughout most of the colony. Ranged against them were the Unionists, who advocated Southern Rhodesia joining the Union of South Africa, and a large number of Independent candidates who were generally in support of continuation of the charter from the British South Africa Company.

Results

By constituency

* Incumbent

Nominated members
The members nominated by the British South Africa Company were:

 James Donald Mackenzie, Attorney-General
 Ernest Charles Baxter, Controller of Customs and Excise
 Dr Eric Arthur Nobbs PhD BSc FHAS, Director of Agriculture
 George Henry Eyre, Postmaster-General
 Sir Ernest William Sanders Montagu, Secretary for Mines and Works
 Percival Donald Leslie Fynn, Treasurer

Robert MacIlwaine, Solicitor-General, was appointed a member to replace Ernest Charles Baxter during Baxter's temporary absence on 6 May 1920. George Henry Eyre stood down and was replaced by Robert MacIlwaine on 25 March 1921.

During a Special Session of the Legislative Council between 3 and 11 October 1923, held to set up the new administration following the award of responsible government, the appointed members were:

 Sir John Robert Chancellor, Governor (sitting in the ex officio seat of the Administrator)
 Percival Donald Leslie Fynn, Treasurer
 Robert James Hudson, Attorney General
 Sir Francis James Newton KCMG CVO, Colonial Secretary
 Eric Arthur Nobbs, Director of Agriculture
 Robert MacIlwaine, Solicitor General
 Dr Andrew Milroy Fleming CMG, Medical Director

References
 Source Book of Parliamentary Elections and Referenda in Southern Rhodesia 1898–1962 ed. by F.M.G. Willson (Department of Government, University College of Rhodesia and Nyasaland, Salisbury 1963)
 Holders of Administrative and Ministerial Office 1894–1964 by F.M.G. Willson and G.C. Passmore, assisted by Margaret T. Mitchell (Source Book No. 3, Department of Government, University College of Rhodesia and Nyasaland, Salisbury 1966)
 Official Year Book of the Colony of Southern Rhodesia, No. 1 – 1924, Salisbury, Southern Rhodesia

Elections in Southern Rhodesia
Southern Rhodesia
Legislative Council election
Southern Rhodesia